Piermario Morosini (5 July 1986 – 14 April 2012) was an Italian professional footballer who played as a midfielder. On 14 April 2012, during a match between Pescara and Livorno, Morosini suffered a fatal cardiac arrest on the pitch.

Early life
Piermario Morosini was born on 5 July 1986, in Bergamo, Italy. His mother Camilla died in 2001, when he was fifteen years old. His father, Aldo, died in 2003, followed shortly after by a disabled brother who committed suicide, leaving him alone with a disabled elder sister.

Shortly after his parents' death, Morosini remarked that "these are the things that change your life, but at the same time make you so angry and help you achieve what was also a dream of my parents."

Club career
Morosini started his career at hometown club Atalanta, and was sold to Udinese in a co-ownership deal during 2005.

On 23 October 2005, he debuts in Serie A in the match Udinese-Inter, collecting in total five appearances in this league. In this season 2005–06 he debuts also in UEFA Cup in the match Levski Sofia-Udinese.

Udinese got full ownership from Atalanta in 2006, and loaned him to Bologna in order to gain experience. From 2007 to 2009 half of the registration rights was farmed to Serie B club Vicenza Calcio. Morosini signed four-year contract with Vicenza and sold for €500,000. Udinese acquired Morosini back from Vicenza for €300,000.

On 31 August 2009, Morosini signed for newly relegated side Reggina on loan.

On 1 February 2010, he was loaned to Calcio Padova. In June 2010, the club decided not to buy him outright.

In January 2011 he was transferred on loan to Vicenza and played 15 times for this club.

On 31 January 2012, he went on loan to Livorno playing 8 matches.

International career
Morosini made his international debut for the Italy U-17 team in 2001 and his U-21 debut in 2006. He was called up for the 2009 European Championships as back-up.

Death and legacy
On 14 April 2012, while representing Livorno, Morosini suffered cardiac arrest and fell to the ground in the 31st minute of the Serie B match away to Pescara. He stumbled on the ground, trying to get up, before losing consciousness and receiving medical attention on the field. A defibrillator was used on Morosini, who was conscious when he was taken on the stretcher. According to the news agency ANSA, a city police car was blocking the stadium's exit for the ambulance for nearly a minute, but a heart specialist said that the delay made no difference. After Morosini was taken to the hospital, the match was abandoned with Livorno leading 2–0, and some players reportedly "left the field in tears".

Morosini was rushed to the Santo Spirito hospital, but reports later indicated he died before reaching the hospital. Italian media reports were alerted of Morosini's death after an "explosion of shouts and tears" by his teammates who had gone to the hospital. All of the Italian football league matches for the weekend were suspended. Livorno and Vicenza then decided they would retire the number 25, the number Morosini wore whilst their player.

Morosini's death came four weeks after Fabrice Muamba suffered a cardiac arrest in an English FA Cup match, after which awareness of heart risk had been raised in Italian football. Morosini's sister, who is disabled, was left with no family. However, Udinese player Antonio Di Natale confirmed that he would financially support and look after her.

Several days after Morosini's death, the Curva Sud of the Stadio Atleti Azzurri d'Italia—the home stadium of Atalanta—was renamed the Curva Piermario Morosini in his honor.

On the third anniversary of his death, Juventus goalkeeper Gianluigi Buffon dedicated his side's 1–0 away win over Monaco in the 2014–15 UEFA Champions League quarter-final to Morosini. The award for the best player of Campionato Primavera is named after him.

References

External links
 Profile at official website of A.S. Livorno Calcio
 Forza Italian Football site
 Photo Gallery

1986 births
2012 deaths
Italian footballers
Udinese Calcio players
Bologna F.C. 1909 players
L.R. Vicenza players
Reggina 1914 players
Calcio Padova players
U.S. Livorno 1915 players
Association football midfielders
Serie A players
Serie B players
Italy youth international footballers
Italy under-21 international footballers
Footballers from Bergamo
Association football players who died while playing
Filmed deaths in sports
Piermario
Sport deaths in Italy